, provisional designation , is a sub-kilometer Florian asteroid from the inner regions of the asteroid belt, approximately  in diameter. It was originally considered a trans-Neptunian object and lost minor planet during 2004–2012. The date of the official discovery was later set to 27 December 2009, and credited to astronomers of the Spacewatch program conducted at the Kitt Peak National Observatory near Tucson, Arizona, in the United States.

Orbit and classification 

 a member of the Flora family, a giant asteroid family and the largest family of stony asteroids in the main-belt. It orbits the Sun in the inner asteroid belt at a distance of 1.9–2.6 AU once every 3 years and 5 months (1,242 days; semi-major axis of 2.26 AU). Its orbit has an eccentricity of 0.14 and an inclination of 4° with respect to the ecliptic. The body's observation arc begins with a precovery taken at Haleakala-AMOS, Hawaii, in December 2005, four years prior to its official discovery observation.

Trans-Neptunian object 

During this time, and with only two observations taken on the same day, it was thought to be a trans-Neptunian object with a semi-major axis of 46 AU. Michael Brown listed it as a likely a dwarf planet on his website with an estimated diameter of 555 kilometers based on an absolute magnitude of 4.6 and an assumed albedo of 0.09.

In 2012, it was finally rediscovered under its principal designation, reclassified as a small main-belt asteroid, and numbered two years later (see below).

Physical characteristics 

 has been characterized as a member of the Flora family, which are stony S-type asteroids with albedo typically around 0.24, corresponding to that of the family's parent body, 8 Flora. Based on a generic magnitude-to-diameter conversion,  measures 690 meters for an absolute magnitude of 18.0 and an assumed albedo of 0.24. As of 2018, no rotational lightcurve has been obtained from photometric observations. The asteroid's rotation period, poles and shape remain unknown.

Numbering and naming 

This minor planet was numbered by the Minor Planet Center on 15 April 2014. As of 2018, it has not been named.

See also 
  – main-belt asteroid originally misidentified as a near-Earth object
  – misidentified nonexistent minor planet

References

External links 
 Asteroid Lightcurve Database (LCDB), query form (info )
 Discovery Circumstances: Numbered Minor Planets (390001)-(395000) – Minor Planet Center
 

392741
392741
20091227